Milton Cogswell (December 4, 1825 – November 20, 1882) was a United States Army officer.

Milton Cogswell was born in Noblesville, Indiana on December 4, 1825. He graduated from the United States Military Academy at West Point in 1849, when he was appointed brevet Second Lieutenant in the 4th United States Infantry. In 1850 he was assigned to duty on the frontier, serving with the 8th Infantry, but he was recalled and detailed as Assistant Professor of Mathematics at West Point until 1856.

When the Civil War broke about, Cogswell went into active service. In July, 1861, he was made Colonel of the Forty-Second New York Volunteers, and at the Battle of Ball's Bluff was captured by the Confederates and incarcerated in Libby Prison, until being exchanged. At the close of the war he was assigned to garrison duty at Baltimore, and afterward served as Acting Judge-Advocate of the Department of North Carolina.

On March 9, 1868, he was made Provisional Mayor of Charleston, South Carolina from March to July and was placed in charge of civil affairs at Summerville. He was afterward performed various duties in the South and on the Western frontier until 1871, when he retired from active service on account of a disability contracted in the line of duty.

He died on November 20, 1882, and was buried at Arlington National Cemetery, in Arlington, Virginia.

References

External links
 

Mayors of Charleston, South Carolina
1825 births
1882 deaths
Burials at Arlington National Cemetery
19th-century American politicians
Union Army colonels
United States Army officers
People from Noblesville, Indiana
Military personnel from Indiana